The Joiners Arms was an LGBT pub and nightclub on Hackney Road in East London.

The original pub, which closed in 2015, had been central to the East London gay scene since it was opened in 1997 by David Alexander Pollard.  
It had been described as "Britain's trendiest gay dive"  with gay public figures including Alexander McQueen, Christopher Kane and Patrick Wolf known to have frequented the venue, and with events hosted by gay entertainers Scottee and Jodie Harsh.
The venue had been open to a range of gay subcultures such as the bear scene and drag queens. Due to its late night opening and free entry, the Joiners Arms had a reputation for being a "last chance saloon" and sometimes having a rough crowd, but this has also been described as part of its appeal.

Plans were announced in 2014 to demolish the venue and replace it with a block of flats, but supporters of the venue successfully campaigned to have it recognised as an Asset of Community Value. Tower Hamlets Council only allowed the construction to proceed if the development included a pub that would "remain a lesbian, gay, bisexual and transgender-focused venue for a minimum of 12 years". This was believed to be the first time that the sexual orientation of a venue's customers had been included as a condition of planning approval.

References

1997 establishments in England
2015 disestablishments in England
Former pubs in London
LGBT pubs in London
Nightclubs in London
Pubs in the London Borough of Tower Hamlets